Panagiotis "Panos" Fasoulas (alternate spelling: Fassoulas; Greek: Παναγιώτης Φασούλας; born May 12, 1963 in Thessaloniki) is a Greek politician and former professional basketball player. He was selected in the second round by the Portland Trail Blazers in the 1986 NBA draft, but never decided to play in the NBA. Considered to be one of the best big men ever in European basketball, Fasoulas became a  FIBA Hall of Fame player in 2016. In 2022, he was inducted into the Greek Basket League Hall of Fame.

Basketball career

College career
As a youth, Fasoulas moved from Greece, to play college basketball in the United States. He first played college ball at the Hellenic College. He was recruited to the school by its head coach at the time, Dick Dukeshire, who had previously worked as a coach in Greece. Fasoulas played two seasons with the school's men's basketball team, the Hellenic College Owls.

Fasoulas then played college ball at North Carolina State University, with the N.C. State Wolfpack. At NC State, he played under legendary head coach Jim Valvano. In his sole season with the Wolfpack (1985–86), Fasoulas averaged 2.8 points and 3.2 rebounds per game, and he also led the team with 1.8 blocks per game, in 29 games played.

Professional career
During his professional career, Fasoulas played for PAOK and Olympiacos. With PAOK, he won the FIBA Cup Winners' Cup championship in the 1990–91 season. With Olympiacos, he won the EuroLeague championship and the Triple Crown in the 1996–97 season.

In total, he won 5 Greek League championships and 3 Greek Cups. He was also named to the FIBA European Selection four times, in the years 1990, 1991 (twice), and 1995. He was also named the Greek League MVP in 1994 and 1995, and a FIBA EuroStar in 1996.

National team career
Fasoulas was also a member of the Greece men's national basketball team, where he was the starting center during Greece's 1987 EuroBasket gold medal victory, being also named to the All-Tournament Team. He also won the silver medal with Greece at the 1989 EuroBasket. In Toronto, Canada, at the 1994 FIBA World Championship, where Greece finished in fourth place, Fasoulas played the best basketball of his career. Fasoulas appeared in 244 games for Greece, averaging 9.77 points per game. He is second all-time in games played and third all-time in points scored for Greece.

Managerial career
After his basketball playing career ended, Fasoulas became a basketball executive. He became the sports director of Olympiacos Women, of the Greek Women's League and the EuroLeague Women.

Awards and accomplishments

Club titles 
 EuroLeague: 1 (with Olympiacos: 1996–97)
 FIBA Cup Winners' Cup: 1 (with PAOK: 1990–91)
 Greek League: 5 (with PAOK: 1991–92 and Olympiacos: 1993–94, 1994–95, 1995–96, 1996–97)
 Greek Cup: 3 (with PAOK: 1983–84 and Olympiacos: 1993–94, 1996–97)

Greece national team
 1981 Balkan Championship: 
 1983 Balkan Championship: 
 1984 Balkan Championship: 
 1986 Balkan Championship: 
 1987 EuroBasket: 
 1989 EuroBasket:

Personal awards 
 EuroBasket All-Tournament Team: (1987)
 FIBA European Selection: 4 (1990, 1991 2×, 1995)
 FIBA EuroStar: 1 (1996)
 Greek League Finals MVP: (1992)
 Greek League MVP: 2 (1994, 1995)
 Greek League All-Star: 3 (1991, 1994 II, 1996 II)
 Greek League Rebounding Leader: (1987)
 FIBA Hall of Fame: (2016)
 Greek League Hall of Fame: (2022)
 Professional Greek League all-time leader in blocks

Political career 
A charismatic personality, Fasoulas entered politics after retiring from sport, joining the political party of PASOK. He contributed in the organization of the Summer Olympic Games in Athens, in 2004. He was elected Mayor of Piraeus on October 15, 2006, and served as Mayor through 2010.

See also 
PASOK
PAOK
Olympiacos
1987 EuroBasket

References

External links 

FIBA Euroleague profile
Basketball-Reference.com profile
RealGM.com profile
Hellenic Basketball Federation profile 

1963 births
Living people
1990 FIBA World Championship players
1994 FIBA World Championship players
Basketball players at the 1996 Summer Olympics
Basketball players from Thessaloniki
Centers (basketball)
FIBA EuroBasket-winning players
FIBA Hall of Fame inductees
Greek expatriate basketball people in the United States
Greek Macedonians
Greek men's basketball players
Greek MPs 2000–2004
Greek MPs 2004–2007
Greek sportsperson-politicians
Hellenic College Owls men's basketball players
Mayors of Piraeus
NC State Wolfpack men's basketball players
Olympiacos B.C. players
Olympic basketball players of Greece
PASOK politicians
P.A.O.K. BC players
Politicians from Thessaloniki
Portland Trail Blazers draft picks
Power forwards (basketball)
Sport in Thessaloniki